Wheatley-Provident Hospital is a historic site at 1826 Forest Avenue in the 18th and Vine District of Kansas City, Missouri. It was founded in 1902 and became Kansas City's first hospital for Black people.

History
The hospital's precursor institution was a small hospital and training school for nurses founded in 1902 by Dr. John Edward Perry. In 1910, it was located at 1214 Vine, named Perry Sanitarium and Nurse Training Association.

On June 1, 1918, after an extensive fundraiser campaign yielding , the facility was relocated to an existing building at 1826 Forest Avenue. Having been built in 1903 as St. Joseph's Parochial School, that building was renamed Wheatley-Provident Hospital and repurposed as Kansas City's first hospital for Black people. It was led by Dr. Perry and his wife Fredericka Douglass Sprague Perry, who was the daughter of Rosetta Douglass and granddaughter of Frederick Douglass.

A children's wing was added in 1925. By 1971, 50,000 patients had been served, and the hospital was closed 1972.

It entered the Kansas City Register of Historic Places in 2007 and was listed on the National Register of Historic Places in October 2020. The property became owned by an absentee landlord, and was declared a hazardous building and threatened with demolition by 2017. The historic building was saved from destruction and rehabilitation began in 2021. The owner is 1826 Forest Re Holdings LLC, which is rehabilitating the property into office space, preferably for tenants in the medical field for consistency with its heritage.

See also
City workhouse castle, a historical building in 18th and Vine
History of the Kansas City metropolitan area
List of points of interest in Kansas City, Missouri

References

External links
 
 

Buildings and structures in Kansas City, Missouri
Buildings and structures completed in 1903
National Register of Historic Places in Jackson County, Missouri
1903 establishments in Missouri
1918 establishments in Missouri
Historically black hospitals in the United States